Vasant Nivruttieao Pawar  is an Indian politician. He was elected to the Lok Sabha, the lower house of the Parliament of India as a member of the Indian National Congress.

References

External links
Official biographical sketch in Parliament of India website
Personal Website

India MPs 1991–1996
Lok Sabha members from Maharashtra
1948 births
2010 deaths